is a Japanese television jidaigeki or period drama that was broadcast from 1991 to 1992. It is the 30th in the Hissatsu series.

Cast
Makoto Fujita as Nakamura Mondo
Kunihiko Mitamura as Hide
Hashinosuke Nakamura as Yumeji
Sakae Takita as Yamada Asaemon
Wakako Sakai as Hatsuse
Yūki Meguro as Narukawa
Megumi Asaoka as Sada
Kin Sugai as Nakamura Sen
Mari Shiraki as Nakamura Ritsu

References

1992 Japanese television series debuts
1990s drama television series
Jidaigeki television series